Peaceful Snow/Lounge Corps is an album by Death in June released in November 2010. This version was available to download from iTunes in November 2010, the CD version with bonus tracks was limited to 3,000 copies. The album was also released as 3 separate 2x10" picture disc editions, as well as a USB version (MP3 & FLAC).

It is their first studio release since 2008's The Rule of Thirds and marks a distinctive change in sound. Unlike the more neofolk sounds of their most recent releases this album is completely piano led, under the moniker of 'Totenkopf Torch Songs'. The 'Lounge Corps' part of the album is a selection of well-known Death in June tracks such as 'Rose Clouds of Holocaust' & 'Fall Apart' reworked in the style of this album & presented as an instrumental version.

Track listing
 "Murder Made History"
 "Fire Feast"
 "Peaceful Snow"
 "Life Under Siege"
 "A Nausea"
 "Wolf Rose"
 "The Scents of Genocide"
 "Red Odin Day"
 "My Company of Corpses"
 "Cemetery Cove"
 "Our Ghosts Gather"
 "Neutralize Decay"
 "The Maverick Chamber"
 "Leopard Flowers"
 "Hail! The White Grain"
 "Break the Black Ice"
 "The Glass Coffin"
 "Kameradshaft"
 "Luther's Army"
 "She Said Destroy"
 "Heaven Street"
 "Jesus, Junk and the Jurisdiction"
 "Runes and Men"
 "But, What Ends When the Symbols Shatter?"
 "The Enemy Within"
 "Fall Apart"
 "Rose Clouds of Holocaust"
 "Idolatry"
 "Golden Wedding of Sorrow"
 "To Drown a Rose"

References
Death in June Official Homepage

Death in June albums
2010 albums